Pomezia is a municipality (comune) in the Metropolitan City of Rome Capital, Lazio, central Italy. In 2009 it had a population of about 60,000.

History
The town was built entirely new near the location of ancient Lavinium on land resulting from the final reclamation of the Pontine Marshes under Benito Mussolini, being inaugurated on 29 October 1939. Its new population was extracted from the poor peasants of Romagna, Veneto and Friuli. Peace did not last long. After being occupied by the forces of the Third Reich, Pomezia was heavily bombed during the Battle of Anzio in World War II. After the end of the war, Pomezia developed as a strong industrial center, especially in the medical and pharmaceutical sectors, as well as a recreational center. It is also home to the production plant of Italian food company Colavita.

Pratica di Mare is the frazione of Pomezia where the ruins of the ancient port of Lavinium are located, now  from the Tyrrhenian Sea. The ancient community was on some hilly ground at the mouth of a stream. Currently the flat alluvial sediment between the hill and the beach is occupied by Pratica di Mare Air Force Base, a facility of the Aeronautica Militare that also finds great utility as a secure airport and a location for air shows and races.

The name of Pomezia comes from the Latin city of Suessa Pometia, although it is unknown where Pometia was located.

Sport
The most popular sport in Pomezia is football (soccer). The oldest and the biggest football club in the comune is Pomezia Calcio, which plays in Lega Pro Seconda Divisione.

Twin towns — sister cities

Pomezia is twinned with:
 Singen, Germany
 Çanakkale, Turkey
 Itápolis, Brazil

References

External links
 

Cities and towns in Lazio
Populated places established in 1939
1939 establishments in Italy
Italian fascist architecture